Major-General Sir James Carmichael-Smyth, 1st Baronet,  (22 February 17794 March 1838) was a British Army officer and colonial administrator.

Biography

Early life and family
Carmichael-Smyth was born in London the eldest son of Scottish physician and medical writer, James Carmichael Smyth and Mary Holyland. His younger brother Henry Carmichael-Smyth, would achieve distinction as an officer serving the East India Company and for being the step-father of William Makepeace Thackeray.

Carmichael Smyth married Harriet Morse, daughter of Robert Morse, on 28May 1816 and they had one son.

Career
He was educated at Charterhouse School and the Royal Military Academy in Woolwich, London before joining the Royal Engineers in March 1795 as a second lieutenant. One of the chief engineering officers of the British Army in Southern Africa between 1795 and 1808, he then went to Spain under Lieutenant-general Sir John Moore in 1808–9. From 1813 to 1815 he was stationed in the Low Countries and was present at the ill-fated Siege of Bergen op Zoom in 1814 before going on to command the Royal Corps of Engineers & Sappers at Waterloo. Prior to the battle, Smyth had created a plan of the ground that allowed Wellington to place his troops rapidly and advantageously.

In 1818 he was on Wellington's staff at the Board of Ordnance and was made a baronet in August 1821. He was sent by Wellington in 1823 to survey the defences in the Low Countries and the British West Indies and in 1825 to repeat the operation in British North America. He was promoted major-general in May 1825 and, after carrying out some engineering works in Ireland, was made Governor of the Bahamas in May 1829. In June 1833 he was transferred to be Governor of British Guiana, where he had to deal with the problems of the emancipation of slaves

Between 1815 and 1831 He had published eight volumes on the subjects of military engineering, defence, and slavery.

Death
He died of an illness on 4March 1838 in Georgetown, Guiana.

Notes

References

Further reading

 

1779 births
1838 deaths
People educated at Charterhouse School
Baronets in the Baronetage of the United Kingdom
British Army personnel of the Napoleonic Wars
Graduates of the Royal Military Academy, Woolwich
British governors of the Bahamas
Governors of British Guiana
Companions of the Order of the Bath
Recipients of the Order of St. Vladimir, 4th class
Recipients of the Waterloo Medal
Royal Engineers officers
Scottish medical writers
Writers from London
British Army major generals